Lin Xu  (1875 – 28 September 1898), courtesy name Tungu, was a Chinese politician, scholar, songwriter and poet who lived in the late Qing dynasty. He was also a student of Kang Youwei, a prominent official and one of the leaders of a reform movement in the late Qing dynasty.

Lin Xu was one of the "Six Gentlemen of Wuxu". On September 28, 1898, he was executed at Caishikou Execution Grounds in Beijing via decapitation.

Biography
Lin Xu was born in Houguan (侯官), which is now Fuzhou, Fujian. He took the imperial examination locally and obtained the position of a "Jieyuan" in 1893. In 1895, he was appointed as an official in the Qing imperial court by the Guangxu Emperor.

In April 1898, in response to foreign imperialism and internal political turmoil within the Qing government, Lin co-founded the State Protection Association with others to oppose colonialism. He fought for radical social, educational and political reforms in China. As one of the Six Gentlemen who attempted to implement the Hundred Days' Reform programme with backing from the Guangxu Emperor, Lin advocated a radical position in which China adopt a modern-style government and convert the absolute monarchy system into a constitutional monarchy.

However, on 21 September 1898, the conservative faction in the Qing government, led by Empress Dowager Cixi, saw the Hundred Days' Reform programme as a foreign plot to overthrow the government. The State Protection Association was disbanded, and the Hundred Days' Reform was terminated, while the Six Gentlemen were arrested and imprisoned. Seven days later, on 28 September, Empress Dowager Cixi ordered the Six Gentlemen to be executed and beheaded outside Xuanwu Gate in Beijing.

References

Qing dynasty politicians from Fujian
1875 births
1898 deaths
Politicians from Fuzhou
Writers from Fuzhou
Musicians from Fuzhou
Poets from Fujian
Qing dynasty poets

Deaths by decapitation